Qiaocheng North station is a Metro station of Shenzhen Metro Line 2. It opened on 28 June 2011.

Station layout

Exits

References

External links
 Shenzhen Metro Qiaocheng North Station (Chinese)
 Shenzhen Metro Qiaocheng North Station (English)

Shenzhen Metro stations
Railway stations in Guangdong
Nanshan District, Shenzhen
Railway stations in China opened in 2011